Thomas Alexander Goldie (T. A. G.) Balfour FRCPE, FRSE ( 1825 - 10 March 1895) was a Scottish physician and botanist. He was the father of Sir Andrew Balfour.

Life
Thomas Balfour graduated at the University of Edinburgh, Medical School, in 1851 with the thesis 'Alcohol as an etiological agent'''. He became a member of the Botanical Society of Edinburgh in 1868, and served as President of the society from 1877–1879, subsequently continuing as a Vice-President and Councillor. He became a Fellow of the Royal Society of Edinburgh in 1870.

Works
  The Typical Character Of Nature, Or, All Nature A Divine Symbol''

References

1895 deaths
Year of birth missing
19th-century Scottish medical doctors
Fellows of the Royal College of Physicians of Edinburgh
Fellows of the Royal Society of Edinburgh
Place of birth missing
Place of death missing